Boulder Creek Bridge may refer to:

 Boulder Creek Bridge (Tortilla Flat, Arizona), listed on the National Register of Historic Places in Maricopa County, Arizona
 Boulder Creek Bridge (Boulder, Colorado), listed on the National Register of Historic Places in Boulder County, Colorado